The women's ski cross event in freestyle skiing at the 2010 Winter Olympics in Vancouver, Canada, took place on 23 February at Cypress Bowl Ski Area.

Results

Qualification
The qualification was held at 10:30.

Elimination round
The top two finishers from each heat advance to the next round. In the semifinals the first two ranked competitors of each heat proceed to the Big Final, third and fourth ranked competitors of each heat proceed to the Small Final.

1/8 round

Heat 1

Heat 2

Heat 3

Heat 4

Heat 5

Heat 6

Heat 7

Heat 8

1/4 Round

Heat 1

Heat 2

Heat 3

Heat 4

Semifinals

Heat 1

Heat 2

Finals
Small Final

Large Final

References

Women's freestyle skiing at the 2010 Winter Olympics
Women's events at the 2010 Winter Olympics

ca:Esquí acrobàtic als Jocs Olímpics d'hivern de 2010 - Camp a través masculí